Karen Lynn Williams is an American writer of children's literature. She is best known for her books about the difficulties of children in developing countries.

Background 

Williams was born in 1952 in New Haven, Connecticut. She was graduated from the University of Connecticut (B.S., 1974) and Southern Connecticut State University (M.S., 1977). She was a teacher of the deaf in Connecticut from 1977 to 1980 and a Peace Corps teacher of English in Malawi from 1980 to 1983. From 1990 to 1993 she lived and worked in Deschapelles, Haiti, where her husband, Steven Williams, was a doctor at the Hôpital Albert Schweitzer.

Williams teaches literature and writing in the Chatham University Master of Fine Arts Program in Children's and Adolescent Writing.

Books
 Galimoto, fiction (New York: Lothrop, 1990).
 Baseball and Butterflies, fiction (New York: Lothrop, 1990).
 When Africa Was Home, fiction (New York: Orchard Book, 1991).
 First Grade King, fiction (New York: Clarion Books, 1992).
 Applebaum's Garage, fiction (New York: Clarion Books, 1993).
 Tap-Tap, fiction (New York: Clarion Books, 1994).
 A Real Christmas This Year, fiction (New York: Clarion Books, 1995).
 Painted Dreams, fiction (New York: Lothrop, Lee, & Shepard Books, 1998).
 One Thing I'm Good at, fiction (New York: Lothrop, Lee, & Shepard Books, 1999).
 Circles of Hope, fiction (Grand Rapids: Eerdmans Books for Young Readers, 2005).
 Four Feet, Two Sandals, fiction (Grand Rapids: Eerdmans Books for Young Readers, 2007).

Sources

Contemporary Authors Online. The Gale Group, 2002. PEN (Permanent Entry Number):  0000106578.

External links

 

1952 births
Living people
Writers from Pittsburgh
University of Connecticut alumni
Southern Connecticut State University alumni
American children's writers
Peace Corps people
Chatham University faculty
American writers of young adult literature
American women writers